Progressive revelation is the doctrine in Christianity that the sections of the Bible that were written later contain a fuller revelation of God than the earlier sections. "Progressive revelation does not mean to say that the Old Testament is somehow less true than the New Testament. The progress was not from untruth to truth - it was from less information to more full information."

For instance, the theologian Charles Hodge wrote:

See also
 Biblical inspiration
 Christian views on the Old Covenant
 Continuous revelation
 Deposit of faith
 Direct revelation
 Dispensationalism
 General revelation
 Progressive revelation (Bahá'í)
 Special revelation
 Supersessionism
 Development of doctrine

References

Further reading 
 .
 .
What is Progressive Revelation

Christian theology of the Bible
Christian terminology
Revelation